Alfredo Carneros Beamud (born October 7, 1978) is a Spanish table tennis player. Carneros narrowly lost the bronze medal to his teammate Carlos Machado in the men's singles at the 2009 Mediterranean Games in Pescara, Italy. As of February 2013, Carneros is ranked no. 215 in the world by the International Table Tennis Federation (ITTF). Carneros is a member of the table tennis team for San Sebastian de los Reyes Sports Club in Madrid, and is coached and trained by Alejandro Maldonado. He is also left-handed, and uses the classic grip.

Carneros qualified for the men's singles tournament, as a 29-year-old, at the 2008 Summer Olympics in Beijing, by receiving an allocation spot from the Final World Qualification Tournament in Budapest, Hungary. He defeated Egypt's Adel Massaad in the preliminary round, before losing out his next match to India's Sharath Kamal, with a final set score of 2–4.

References

External links
NBC Olympics Profile
Entrevista en diarionoroeste.es (29/2014)

1978 births
Living people
Spanish male table tennis players
Table tennis players at the 2008 Summer Olympics
Olympic table tennis players of Spain
Sportspeople from Madrid
Competitors at the 2009 Mediterranean Games
Mediterranean Games competitors for Spain